In molecular biology, the hexon protein is a major coat protein found in Adenoviruses. Hexon coat proteins are synthesised during late infection and form homo-trimers. The 240 copies of the hexon trimer that are produced are organised so that 12 lie on each of the 20 facets. The central 9 hexons in a facet are cemented together by 12 copies of polypeptide IX. The penton complex, formed by the peripentonal hexons and penton base (holding in place a fibre), lie at each of the 12 vertices. The hexon coat protein is a duplication consisting of two domains with a similar fold packed together like the nucleoplasmin subunits. Within a hexon trimer, the domains are arranged around a pseudo 6-fold axis. The domains have a beta-sandwich structure consisting of 8 strands in two sheets with a jelly-roll topology; each domain is heavily decorated with many insertions. Some hexon proteins contain a distinct C-terminal domain.

Hexon directly recruits the cellular motor protein dynein in a pH-dependent manner. The dynein-regulatory protein, dynactin, was found to play a clear role in regulating the dynein-adenovirus complex transport to the nucleus.

References 

Protein domains